Meadowville is a community in the Canadian province of Nova Scotia, located  in Pictou County. Author Johanna Skibsrud is a native of Meadowville.

References
Meadowville on Destination Nova Scotia

Communities in Pictou County
General Service Areas in Nova Scotia